Rock and Roll Heart is the seventh solo studio album by American musician Lou Reed, released in October 1976. It was his first album for Arista Records after record mogul Clive Davis reportedly rescued him from bankruptcy. "A Sheltered Life" dates back to 1967, when the Velvet Underground recorded a demo of it (available on Peel Slowly and See).  The Velvet Underground also performed "Follow the Leader", and a live recording of it was released on The Quine Tapes.

The cover art is credited to Mick Rock.

Track listing
All tracks composed by Lou Reed.

Side one
"I Believe in Love" – 2:46
"Banging on My Drum" – 2:11
"Follow the Leader" – 2:13
"You Wear It So Well" – 4:52
"Ladies Pay" – 4:22
"Rock and Roll Heart" – 3:05

Side two
"Chooser and the Chosen One" – 2:47
"Senselessly Cruel" – 2:08
"Claim to Fame" – 2:51
"Vicious Circle" – 2:53
"A Sheltered Life" – 2:20
"Temporary Thing" – 5:13

Personnel
Musicians
 Lou Reed – vocals, guitar, piano
 Marty Fogel – saxophone
 Michael Fonfara – piano, Hammond organ, clavinet, ARP, synthesiser
 Bruce Yaw – bass guitar
 Michael Suchorsky – drums
 Garland Jeffreys – backing vocals on "You Wear It So Well"

Production and artwork
 Corky Stasiak – engineer, mixing
 Julie Harris – art direction
 Steve Ridgeway – art direction
 Mick Rock – cover design, photography

Charts

References

External links

1976 albums
Lou Reed albums
Arista Records albums
Albums produced by Lou Reed
Albums with cover art by Mick Rock